Snorre is an oil and gas field in the Tampen area in the southern part of the Norwegian Sea. Snorre has been operational since August 1992. It was the first field developed by Saga Petroleum.

A Plateosaurus knucklebone, specimen PMO 207.207, was discovered in 1997 at  while drilling the Snorre oil field.

Production
Snorre A platform in the south is a floating steel facility for accommodation, drilling and processing. Snorre A has also a separate process module for production from the Vigdis field. A subsea template with ten well slots, Snorre UPA, is located centrally in the field and connected to Snorre A. Oil and gas from Snorre A is piped to the nearby Statfjord A platform for final processing.

Snorre B platform is located in the northern part of the field and is a semi-submersible integrated drilling, processing and accommodation steel facility. Oil from Snorre B is piped 45 km to Statfjord B platform for storage and export.

The Snorre field is operated by Statoil.  In 2009, Statoil started a project to upgrade the offshore production complex.  The Norwegian Petroleum Directorate is requesting Statoil to build a new platform at the field.

Reserves

References

Equinor oil and gas fields
Natural gas fields in Norway
North Sea oil fields
Oil fields in Norway